Gabrielle Destroismaisons (born December 29, 1982 in Saint-Lin-Laurentides, Quebec) is a Québécois singer. In 2000, she released her debut album Etc..., which sold more than 100,000 copies in a few months and led to Destroismaisons being awarded one win and two nominations at the 2002 Félix Awards and a nomination at the 2002 Juno Awards. She participated in the 20 year anniversary show of "La fureur" as a guest singer.

Discography 
 2000: Etc...
 2003: La vie qui danse
 2004: Gabrielle Destroismaisons

Videography 
 "Et cetera"
 "Into You"
 "Le big bang"
 "Suivre l'étoile"
 "Laisse-moi"
 "Folle folie" (2004)
 "Elle attend"

Awards and nominations

Prix Félix (Félix Awards) 
 2001
 Won Révélation de l'année (New Artist of the Year)
 Nominated for Album de l'année, pop/rock (Album of the Year, Pop/Rock) for Etc...
 Nominated for Interprète féminine de l'année (Female Performer of the Year)

 2003
 Nominated for Album de l'année, pop/rock (Album of the Year, Pop/Rock) for La vie qui danse

Juno Awards 
 2002
 Nominated for Best New Solo Artist
 Nominated for Best Selling Francophone Album for Etc...

References

External links 
 Gabrielle sur QuébecInfoMusique

1982 births
Canadian dance musicians
French Quebecers
Living people
Singers from Montreal
French-language singers of Canada
Canadian women pop singers
21st-century Canadian women singers